This is a list of rural localities in the Komi Republic. The Komi Republic is a federal subject of Russia (a republic). Its capital is the city of Syktyvkar. The population of the republic, as of the 2010 Census was 901,189.

Argayashsky District 
Rural localities in Argayashsky District:

 Abez

Izhemsky District 
Rural localities in Izhemsky District:

 Izhma

Kortkerossky District 
Rural localities in Kortkerossky District:

 Kortkeros

Koygorodsky District 
Rural localities in Koygorodsky District:

 Koygorodok

Priluzsky District 
Rural localities in Priluzsky District:

 Obyachevo

Syktyvdinsky District 
Rural localities in Syktyvdinsky District:

 Vylgort

Sysolsky District 
Rural localities in Sysolsky District:

 Vizinga

Troitsko-Pechorsky District 
Rural localities in Troitsko-Pechorsky District:

 Yaksha

Udorsky District 
Rural localities in Udorsky District:

 Glotovo
 Koslan

Ust-Kulomsky District 
Rural localities in Ust-Kulomsky District:

 Ust-Kulom

Ust-Tsilemsky District 
Rural localities in Ust-Tsilemsky District:

 Novy Bor
 Ust-Tsilma

Ust-Vymsky District 
Rural localities in Ust-Vymsky District:

 Aykino
 Ust-Vym

Vuktyl 
Rural localities in Vuktyl urban okrug:

 Ust-Shchuger

See also 
 
 Lists of rural localities in Russia

References 

Komi Republic